Beith North railway station was a railway station serving the north of the town of Beith, North Ayrshire, Scotland. The station was originally part of the Glasgow, Paisley, Kilmarnock and Ayr Railway (later part of the Glasgow and South Western Railway (G&SWR), now the Ayrshire Coast Line).


History
The station opened on 21 July 1840 when it was simply known as Beith. Upon the grouping of the G&SWR into the London, Midland and Scottish Railway (LMS) in 1923, the station was renamed Beith North on 2 June 1924. The name change was to avoid confusion with the Caledonian/G&SW jointly owned nearby station of same the name, which was also incorporated into the LMS.
Beith North closed permanently on 4 June 1951.

The Railway Inn was opposite the station entrance and is now a private residence known as Kerse Bridge. The OS maps show that the road down from Beith was diverted when the railway was built; the course of the old road with its hedgerows can still be discerned.

References

Notes

Sources 
 

Disused railway stations in North Ayrshire
Railway stations in Great Britain opened in 1840
Railway stations in Great Britain closed in 1951
Former Glasgow and South Western Railway stations